Girardin Jean-Louis is an American academic who is a Professor in the Departments of Psychiatry and Neurology at the University of Miami, Miller School of Medicine. He serves as Director of the Translational Sleep and Circadian Sciences Program and the "Program to Increase Diversity among Individuals Engaged in Health-Related Research" (PRIDE BSM) Institute. Dr. Jean-Louis’ translational behavioral sleep and circadian research was recently featured in Science and NPR. In 2020, he was named ‘Pioneer in Minority Health and Health Disparities’ and one of the Community of Scholars' most inspiring Black scientists in America. In 2021, he received the Mary A. Carskadon Outstanding Educator Award from the Sleep Research Society, and in 2022 the Diversity, Equity, and Inclusion Leadership Award from the American Academy of Sleep Medicine.

Early life and education 
Jean-Louis grew up in Haiti. He became interested in engineering as a child, and particularly enjoyed building different contraptions. At the age of seventeen he immigrated to New York City, where he joined the City College of New York as an undergraduate student in engineering. As a student he took an elective course in sleep lab techniques, and became interested in sleep and wakefulness. He earned his doctoral degree at the City University of New York. His doctoral research considered the impact of melatonin on sleep and cognition in elderly individuals. He was a postdoctoral research associate at the University of California, San Diego, where he specialized in sleep and chronobiology. As part of his research, Jean-Louis advanced the science around wearable technologies (actigraphy) to monitor patient's sleep-wake behavior out of hospital and expensive laboratories. In the early days of his research on sleep science, Jean-Louis struggled to find academic mentors, particularly mentors of color. He continued to improve the science of actigraphy such that it could be more readily used to collect sleep data in the comfort and safety of patient's own home.

Research and career 
Jean-Louis studies the sociocultural and environmental determinants of health. His research considers sleep medicine and health equity, an in particular, how low-income and minority communities are impacted by insufficient sleep. He is particularly interested in why sleep apnea is under-diagnosed in African-Americans. In 2008, he showed that less than 40% of African-American patients with sleep apnea agreed to having a diagnostic test. In an effort to understand the sleep behavior of minority groups, Jean-Louis has led several outreach initiatives. These include programs in churches, barber shops and health salons.

Jean-Louis was awarded an National Institute on Aging (NIA) Leadership Career Award in 2018. In 2020, he was selected as one of The Community of Scholars' most inspiring Black scientists in America. Alongside his academic research, Jean-Louis has launched several initiatives to support underrepresented minority groups in science and medicine. As the satisfaction and medical outcomes of communities of color are impacted by the racial/ethnic heritage of the physician, Jean-Louis believes there is an urgent need for more diverse medical practitioners.

Selected publications

References 

American people of Haitian descent
City University of New York alumni
City College of New York alumni
New York University faculty
Year of birth missing (living people)
American psychiatrists
Psychiatry academics
Living people
Sleep researchers